Air Marshal Sir Alfred Henry Wynne Ball,  (18 January 1921 – 25 January 2012) was a Royal Air Force officer who became Deputy Commander of Strike Command.

RAF career
Educated at Campbell College in Belfast, Ball joined the Royal Air Force in 1937. He served in the Second World War flying Spitfires and commanding No. 682 Squadron, No. 542 Squadron, No. 540 Squadron and finally No. 13 Squadron, he was mentioned in despatches twice. He was appointed Chief of Staff at Supreme Headquarters Allied Powers Europe in 1968, Director General of RAF Organisation in 1971 and UK Military Representative to the Central Treaty Organization at Ankara in 1975. He went on to be Deputy Commander of Strike Command in 1977 before retiring in 1979.

In retirement he became an advisor to International Computers Limited. He died on 25 January 2012.

Family
In 1942 he married Nan McDonald; they have three sons and one daughter.

References

External links
 Obituary in The Telegraph
 Obituary in The Independent

1921 births
2012 deaths
People educated at Campbell College
Royal Air Force air marshals
British World War II fighter pilots
Knights Commander of the Order of the Bath
Companions of the Distinguished Service Order
Recipients of the Distinguished Flying Cross (United Kingdom)
Royal Air Force pilots of World War II